Deepak Kapur (born August 24, 1950) is a Distinguished Professor in the Department of Computer Science at the University of New Mexico.

Biography 
Kapur was born in a lower-middle-class family based in Amritsar, where his father, Nawal Kishore Kapur, was a cloth broker; his mother, Bimla Vati, was a housewife.

Education 
Kapur's early education was at the Government Primary School, Katra Khazana, Amritsar, until 3rd grade. He was then shifted to the Vidya Bhushan Primary School, Amritsar. After 5th grade, he had to change school again to Dayanand Anglo Vedic (DAV) Higher Secondary School until 11th grade. He was selected in the Indian Institute of Technology (IIT) entrance examination in 1966. He got his undergraduate degree (B.Tech) in Electric Engineering from IIT, Kanpur, in 1971 and M. Tech. degree in Computer Science in May 1973 also from IIT, Kanpur.

Academic career 

After graduating from MIT in March 1980, Kapur joined as a research staff at GE Corporate Research and Development (GECRD), Schenectady, NY, where he worked until Dec. 1987. While being at GECRD, he was an adjunct professor at Rensselaer Polytechnic Institute (RPI), where he taught a course on automated reasoning based on term rewriting. At RPI he also co-supervised Ph.D. dissertations of Abdelilah Kandri-Rody and Hantao Zhang.

Kapur was hired in 1988 as a tenured full professor at the University at Albany, State University of New York. In 1998, Kapur got the distinguished research award. 

Kapur became the Chair of the Computer Science department at the University of New Mexico (UNM) in December 1998, a position he held until June 2006. In 2007, Kapur was made a Distinguished Professor at UNM. In May, 2010, Kapur was awarded Senior Faculty Research Excellence Award by the School of Engineering of the UNM.

Kapur has held visiting appointments at Massachusetts Institute of Technology, Max Planck Institute for Informatics, Tata Institute of Fundamental Research, Mumbai, Indian Institute of Technology, Delhi, Institute of Software (Beijing), the Chinese Academy of Sciences (ISCAS), Institute IMDEA Software, Madrid, among other institutions.

Kapur has served as a Consultant to GE Corporate Research and Development, Sandia National Labs, IBM Research at Watson and Fujitsu Labs.

Kapur was the Editor-in-Chief of the Journal of Automated Reasoning from 1993-2007. He has served on the editorial board of many journals including Journal of Automated Reasoning, Journal of Symbolic Computation, Journal of Logic and Algebra Programming, Journal of Applicable Algebra in Engineering, Communication and Computing. Kapur also served on the board of Leibniz International Proceedings in Informatics.

Kapur was a Board Member of the United Nations University - International Institute for Software Technology as well as United Nation University - Computing and Society. He was also a board member of the Computer Science Research Institute of the Sandia National Laboratories and Los Alamos Computer Science Institute (LACSI). 

Kapur received the Herbrand Award in 2009:

Research 
Kapur has published over 150 papers on Programming Languages, Formal Methods including Software and Hardware Verification, Automated Theorem Proving, Term Rewriting, Inductive Theorem Proving, Unification Theory, Complexity of Automated Reasoning Algorithms, Geometry Theorem Proving, Groebner basis, parametric (Comprehensive) Groebner Basis, Multivariate Dixon Resultants, among other topics. 

Kapur developed the software tool Rewrite Rule Laboratory (RRL), the world’s first theorem prover based on term rewriting and the Knuth-Bendix completion procedure and its generalization. The theorem prover mechanized equational, first-order, and inductive reasoning. At GECRD, Kapur designed and led the development of GeoMeter, a system for geometric and algebraic reasoning based on Groebner basis and parametric Groebner basis for applications to geometry theorem proving and computer vision.
At the University at Albany, State University of New York, Kapur with Musser led the development of a hypertext based system, Tecton, for hierarchical proof management., on top of RRL.
These systems have been used in applications of hardware verification, specification analysis, geometric modeling, and computer vision.

Selected publications

References 

University of New Mexico faculty
Massachusetts Institute of Technology alumni
IIT Kanpur alumni
Indian computer scientists
1950 births
Living people